This page lists the marathon runs in Africa.

Legend

Race list

See also 

 List of marathon races in Asia
 List of marathon races in Australia
 List of marathon races in Europe
 List of marathon races in North America
 List of marathon races in South America
 IAAF Road Race Label Events
 World Marathon Majors

References

External links 

 List of marathons 1940–present (Association of Road Racing Statisticians)
 List of marathons from Association of International Marathons and Road Races

Marathon races